Aníbal Samuel Matellán (born 8 May 1977) is an Argentine former football defender. He last played for Argentinos Juniors.

Career
Matellán started his career with the Argentine giants Boca Juniors, after several years of success with the club. During his time there, Boca won six major titles in five seasons: three league titles, two Copa Libertadores titles and one Intercontinental Cup. In 2001, he was transferred to the German side, FC Schalke 04, and helped the team to win the DFB-Pokal in 2002.

After three seasons with the Germans, Matellán  returned to Boca where he won another major title, the Copa Sudamericana. During his two spells with Boca, Matellán made 132 appearances for the club scoring three goals. In 2005, he signed for the Spanish side Getafe CF. However, after playing for them for just one season, he moved to the new La Liga team, Gimnàstic. After the 2006–07 season, he moved back to Argentina, signing for Arsenal de Sarandí.

Matellán headed one of the most important goals of his career on 30 November 2007 in the first leg of the Copa Sudamericana 2007 final against América to help give Arsenal a valuable 3–2 lead going into the second leg. After three years with Arsenal de Sarandí, it was announced on 14 June 2010 that he would move to the Mexican side San Luis FC.

After retirement
On 17 December 2018, Matellán returned to Boca Juniors in the role as a Sports Secretary. He left his position at the end of 2019.

Honours

Honours
Schalke 04
UEFA Intertoto Cup: 2003

References

External links
 Argentine Primera statistics at Fútbol XXI 
 BDFA prolife 

1977 births
Living people
Sportspeople from Buenos Aires Province
Argentine footballers
Argentine people of Spanish descent
Association football defenders
Boca Juniors footballers
FC Schalke 04 players
Getafe CF footballers
Gimnàstic de Tarragona footballers
Arsenal de Sarandí footballers
San Luis F.C. players
Argentinos Juniors footballers
Argentine Primera División players
Bundesliga players
La Liga players
Liga MX players
Argentine expatriate footballers
Argentine expatriate sportspeople in Spain
Expatriate footballers in Germany
Expatriate footballers in Mexico
Expatriate footballers in Spain